The International Society for the Psychoanalytic Study of Organizations is a professional organization with 320 members from around the world. The largest contingents are from Eastern and Western Europe (103) the United States (100), Australia (50) and the United Kingdom (44). Members come from a wide range of professions including academicians, organization consultants, psychoanalysts, psychiatrists, psychologists and human resource professionals. 

The Society seeks to  help establish and sustain a community of thinkers and practitioners who share an interest in examining organizations from a psychoanalytic perspective. It helps scholars and practitioners from different disciplines, countries and with varying political persuasions to develop and communicate ideas, including those focused on applying research and theory to practice. It provides a public forum for discussing, presenting and distributing papers that explore the field of the psychoanalytic organizational studies.

Activities
The Society holds an annual week-long meeting, with four days dedicated to workshops focused on professional development and three days dedicated to a symposium for the presentation and discussion of scholarly papers. Each annual meeting is sponsored by members in a particular country and is organized around a particular theme. In addition, members from Australia, Europe, the United States and South America hold regional meetings to consider a particular theme or issue. The Society’s Annual Meeting has been held in Helsingør, Jerusalem, London, Melbourne, Paris, Philadelphia and Stockholm, among other cities. Conference themes have been “Motivation and Meaning at Work,” “The Dark Side of Competition: Psychoanalytic Insights,” Power, Politics, Destructiveness and “Creativity in Organizations: A Psychoanalytic Perspective.”

Members and non-members submit abstracts for papers they wish to present at the symposium. The organizing committee selects some number of these abstracts for presentation as full papers at the symposium itself. Papers typically cover a wide range of topics. Many of the papers presented at the symposiums are based on case studies of consultations to businesses and not for profit organizations.

These symposia, while organized as traditional academic conferences, have two unusual features. Each morning symposium members can participate in a “social dreaming matrix” and in the afternoon, in a summative reflection on learnings of the day. Both the morning and afternoon activities enact the Society’s belief that groups can facilitate individual learning, through self-reflection and by eliciting people’s unconsciously coded responses to the themes, issues and events of a particular setting.

Scholarship
Many of the papers presented at the symposiums have been published in academic journals and books. Several books, published by Karnac Press, draw on papers presented at the symposiums as well as the work and writing of individual members. Examples are, Psychoanalytic Studies of Organizations: Contributions from the International Society for the Psychoanalytic Study of Organizations  and Psychoanalytic Reflections in a Changing World.  Members have contributed to the academic journal Organizational and Social Dynamics,  edited by members of OPUS, (the Organization for Promoting the Understanding of Society), which focuses on the links between a psychoanalytic understanding and social issues, as well as to the journal Socioanalysis published in Melbourne. ISPSO has a growing online library of abstracts and full articles from symposia and other sources   Some of this material is restricted to members, but much of it is available freely to anyone.

Roots and Connections
The Society in its mission represents one example of what is called more broadly “Applied Psychoanalysis”. Other examples are using psychoanalytic theory and concepts to understand literature, and psychohistory, or exploring the biographies of people in their social-historical context. Psychoanalytic Institutes apply psychoanalysis when they work with schools, prisons, and other human service organizations where emotions and their vicissitudes play an important role.

(OPUS) The society has relationships and overlapping memberships with other organizations, including  the Organization for Promoting the Understanding of Society (OPUS), the A.K. Rice Institutes in the United States, and Group Relations organizations in other countries.

References

Psychological societies